Adullamitis is a genus of moth in the family Gelechiidae. It contains the species Adullamitis emancipata, which is found in Brazil.

References

Gelechiinae
Taxa named by Edward Meyrick
Monotypic moth genera
Moths of South America